Charles Alexander Keith (February 28, 1883 – June 22, 1960) was an American football, basketball and baseball coach. He served as the head football coach at Eastern Kentucky University in 1912 after serving as the head baseball coach at the University of Texas in 1910.  Keith was a Rhodes Scholar and a member of the faculty at Eastern Kentucky for 41 years.

Head coaching record

Football

College baseball

References

External links
 

1883 births
1960 deaths
Baseball pitchers
Arkansas Razorbacks baseball players
Eastern Kentucky Colonels athletic directors
Eastern Kentucky Colonels men's basketball coaches
Eastern Kentucky Colonels football coaches
Little Rock Travelers players
Texas Longhorns baseball coaches
Eastern Kentucky University faculty
American Rhodes Scholars
Sportspeople from Hot Springs, Arkansas
Baseball players from Arkansas
Basketball coaches from Arkansas